Pherendatis (died 466 BC) was an Achaemenid Persian general who was appointed Supreme Commander of the ground forces in the Battle of the Eurymedon. He perished in this battle.

References

Military leaders of the Achaemenid Empire
466 BC deaths
Year of birth unknown
5th-century BC Iranian people